The following is a list of players who formed part of the All-American Girls Professional Baseball League during its twelve years of existence, from its inception in 1943 through the 1954 season.

This list presents data from an eight-year collaborative research project commanded by the All-American Girls Professional Baseball League Players Association and is considered to be the definitive list of all the known players that ever formed part of the league.

In addition, the association recognized players who had contracts with the league, even though they may not have played a single game during their career in the circuit. All players were included on the Official AAGPBL Roster printed in 1997 and submitted to the Hall.

For reasons of space, this list is broken down into five pages to reduce the size:
 List 1 – Velma Abbott through Shirley Crites
 List 2 – Sarah Mavis Dabbs through Julie Gutz
 List 3 – Carol Habben through Esther Lyman
 List 4 – Mary McCarty through Margaret Russo
 List 5 – Tony Sachetti through Agnes Zurkowski

Sources
All-American Girls Professional Baseball League official website – profiles search
All-American Girls Professional Baseball League Record Book – W. C. Madden. Publisher: McFarland & Company, 2000. Format: Hardcover, 294pp. Language: English. 
The Women of the All-American Girls Professional Baseball League: A Biographical Dictionary – W. C. Madden. Publisher:  McFarland & Company, 2005. Format: Softcover, 295 pp. Language: English. 

 
Lists of baseball players